Prana are Tsuyoshi Suzuki, Nick Taylor, and Andy Guthrie, a Goa trance project from Japan. They were one of the most acclaimed pioneers of Goa Trance music style. They formed in 1993.

Discography
Cyclone (Matsuri Productions 1996)
Geomantik (Matsuri Productions 1997)

Trance music groups